Garvin Aparicio (born 15 August 1970) is a former Bermudian cricketer. Aparicio is a left-handed batsman. He was born in Bermuda.

Aparicio made a single Twenty20 appearances for Bermuda against Guyana in the 2008 Stanford 20/20. He was dismissed for 3 runs Lennox Cush in Bermuda's total of just 62 all out. Bermuda lost the match by 9 wickets.

References

External links
Garvin Aparicio at ESPNcricinfo
Garvin Aparicio at CricketArchive

1970 births
Living people
Bermudian cricketers